Paweł Gamla (born 6 August 1976 in Lublin) is a Polish former professional footballer who played as a defender.

Career

Club
In July 2011, he joined Polonia Bytom on a one-year contract.

References

External links
 

1976 births
Living people
Sportspeople from Lublin
Polish footballers
Ekstraklasa players
I liga players
II liga players
III liga players
Avia Świdnik players
Hetman Zamość players
Piast Gliwice players
Polonia Bytom players
Association football defenders